The Queen of the Tearling is the debut novel of Erika Johansen. It is set on a fictional landmass several centuries in the future, and is the first novel of a fantasy trilogy. The other books in the trilogy are The Invasion of the Tearling (2015) and The Fate of the Tearling (2016).

Plot
Princess Kelsea Raleigh Glynn must defeat the powers of the Red Queen, who is out to destroy her. She must journey to the royal castle to claim her throne, and is accompanied only by the loyal Queen's Guard which is led Carroll and the mysterious Lazarus. Along the way she must earn the respect of her people and fix the broken shambles of the Kingdom of Tear.

Reaction
The Detroit Free Press reported Emma Watson "conceded she couldn't put the book down. Having sworn she'd never do another franchise, her interest is a gigantic compliment...".

References

External links
 REVIEW : The Queen of the Tearling at Upcoming4.me

Fantasy novel series
2014 American novels
American fantasy novel series
American fantasy novels
2014 fantasy novels
American novels adapted into films
2014 debut novels
HarperCollins books